This was the third edition of the tournament. It was held after a one year pause.

Seeds

Draw

References
 Main Draw

IS Open de Tênis - Doubles